This is a list of notable cheese dishes in which cheese is used as a primary ingredient or as a significant component of a dish or a food. Cheese is a food derived from milk that is produced in a wide range of flavors, textures, and forms by coagulation of the milk protein casein. It comprises proteins and fat from milk, usually the milk of cows, buffalo, goats, or sheep.

Cheese dishes and foods

 
 
 
 
 
 
 
 
 
 
 
 
 
 
 
 
 
 
 
 
 
 
 
 
 
 
 
 
 
 
 
 
 
 
 
 
 
 
 
 
 
 
 
 
 
 
 
 
 
 
 
 
 
 
 
 
 
 
 
 
 
 
 
 
 
 
 
 
 
 Mazë

Indian

See also

 Cheese dishes (Category page)
 List of cheese soups
 List of cheeses
 List of fondues

References

External links
 
 

 
Cheese dishes
Dishes